Pseudogordiorhynchus is a monotypic genus of worms belonging to the family Plagiorhynchidae. The only species is Pseudogordiorhynchus antonmeyeri.

References

Monotypic animal genera
Plagiorhynchidae
Acanthocephala genera